Tetyana Ivanivna Kocherhina (née Makarets, born 26 March 1956) is a retired Ukrainian handball player. Competing for the Soviet Union she won gold medals at the 1976 and 1980 Olympics and three medals at the world championships in 1973–1978. During her career Kocherhina played 133 international matches and scored 616 goals, more than anyone in the Soviet team. She was the best scorer of the 1975 World Championships.

Makarets was the youngest child in a family of nine siblings. She took up handball around 1968, and in 1972 was included to the Soviet national team. In 1976 she married a fellow handball player Sergey Kochergin and changed her last name from Makarets to Kocherhina/Kochergina. In 1981 she retired from the national team due to injuries and gave birth to a daughter, but then played for a few years with the local club in Brovary. In April 1988 she started lecturing at the Faculty of Sports of the Taras Shevchenko National University of Kyiv and later became its dean.

References

1956 births
Living people
Soviet female handball players
Ukrainian female handball players
Handball players at the 1976 Summer Olympics
Handball players at the 1980 Summer Olympics
Olympic handball players of the Soviet Union
Olympic gold medalists for the Soviet Union
Olympic medalists in handball
Medalists at the 1980 Summer Olympics
Medalists at the 1976 Summer Olympics
National University of Ukraine on Physical Education and Sport alumni
Sportspeople from Odesa Oblast